Eduard Hartmann (born 5 June 1965 in Skalica, Czechoslovakia) is a Slovak ice hockey coach and former international ice hockey goaltender. He is the elder brother of ice hockey forward Richard Hartmann.

Playing career

Club
Eduard Hartmann is known primarily for his membership at the HK Dukla Trenčín, with which he won the 1993–94 season championship title. He played for HK Dukla Trenčín from 1986 to 1994 with the exception of the 1991–92 season when he was at the HC Kometa Brno. After one season with the German Eisbären Berlin in the 1994–95 season, Hartmann returned to his home club. Finally, he played for HK Spišská Nová Ves between 1996 and 1998.

International
He took part at the 1994 Winter Olympics in Lillehammer, Norway, where his national team ranked at 6th place. In the same year, the national team was successful with him at the World Cup to advance to the Division B from the Division C after defeating Kazakhstan, Ukraine and Belarus. In total, he capped 41 times for the national team.

Coaching career
After retiring from active playing career, he served in various posts at the HK Dukla Trenčín as coach of the junior team and manager of the youth team. In the 2008–09 season, he was appointed chairman of the board and general manager of the club. Hartmann appeared also regularly on the television channel STV as commentator for ice hockey games. Currently, he is serving as assistant coach of the Turkey women's and the head coach of the men's and men's U-20 national teams.

References

External links
 

1965 births
Living people
Czechoslovak ice hockey goaltenders
Eisbären Berlin players
HC Kometa Brno players
HK Dukla Trenčín players
HK Spišská Nová Ves players
Ice hockey players at the 1994 Winter Olympics
Olympic ice hockey players of Slovakia
Sportspeople from Skalica
Slovak expatriate ice hockey players in Germany
Slovak expatriate sportspeople in Turkey
Slovak ice hockey coaches
Slovak ice hockey goaltenders